Bukungu is a town in the Buyende District of the Eastern Region of Uganda.

Location
Bukungu is in extreme northern Buyende District, at the northern end of the Kamuli-Bukungu Road.

The coordinates of the town are:01°26'10.0"N,  32°52'07.0"E (Latitude:01°26'10.0"N; Longitude:32°52'07.0"E).

Overview
Bukungu is the location of the headquarters of Bukungu Parish, one of the parishes in Kidera Sub-county, a constituent of Buyende District. Bukungu is close to the point where the Victoria Nile enters Lake Kyoga, to the west of town. The town sits on a peninsula that projects into Lake Kyoga. The town and surrounding villages constitutes a very low income community, where sanitation and sourcing clean, drinking water is a challenge.

See also
 List of cities and towns in Uganda

References

External links
 Buyende: face-to-face with a failed district
 Uganda: Ministry Halts Buyende Fisheries Plan

Populated places in Uganda
Cities in the Great Rift Valley
Buyende District
Lake Kyoga
Busoga